In computing, route is a command used to view and manipulate the IP routing table in Unix-like and Microsoft Windows operating systems and also in IBM OS/2 and ReactOS. Manual manipulation of the routing table is characteristic of static routing.

Implementations

Unix and Unix-like
In Linux distributions based on 2.2.x Linux kernels, the ifconfig and route commands are operated together to connect a computer to a network, and to define routes between computer networks. Distributions based on later kernels have deprecated ifconfig and route, replacing them with iproute2.
Route for Linux was originally written by Fred N. van Kempen.

Syntax
The command-syntax is:
 route [-nNvee] [-FC] [<AF>]           List kernel routing tables
 route [-v] [-FC] {add|del|flush} ...  Modify routing table for AF.
 route {-h|--help} [<AF>]              Detailed usage syntax for specified AF.
 route {-V|--version}                  Display version/author and exit.

Example
user@linux:~$ route -n
Kernel IP routing table
Destination     Gateway         Genmask         Flags Metric Ref    Use Iface
192.168.101.0   192.168.102.102 255.255.255.0   UG    0      0        0 eth0
192.168.102.0   0.0.0.0         255.255.255.0   U     0      0        0 eth0
192.168.103.0   192.168.102.102 255.255.255.0   UG    0      0        0 eth0
192.168.12.0    0.0.0.0         255.255.255.0   U     0      0        0 eth0
0.0.0.0         192.168.12.1    0.0.0.0         UG    0      0        0 eth0

Microsoft Windows
The command is only available if the TCP/IP protocol is installed as a component in the properties of a network adapter.

Syntax
The command-syntax is:
 route [-f] [-p] [-4|-6] [Command [Destination] [mask Netmask] [Gateway] metric Metric if Interface

Parameters
 -f: Clears the routing table
 -p: The route is added to the Windows Registry and is used to initialize the IP routing table whenever the TCP/IP protocol is started (only when used with the add command)
 Command: The command to run (add, change, delete, print)
 -4: Force using IPv4
 -6: Force using IPv6
 Destination: Network destination of the route
 mask Netmask: The netmask (subnet mask) associated with the network destination
 Gateway: The forwarding or next hop IP address over which the set of addresses defined by the network destination and subnet mask are reachable
 metric Metric: Integer cost metric (ranging from 1 to 9999) for the route
 if Interface: The index of the interface over which the destination is reachable
 /?: Command help

The -p parameter is only supported on Windows NT 4.0, Windows 2000, Windows Millennium Edition, and Windows XP. It is not supported on Windows 95 or Windows 98.

IBM OS/2

Syntax
The command-syntax is:
 route [-nqv] [COMMAND] [[MODIFIERS] args]

Parameters
 -n: Bypasses translating IP addresses to symbolic host names
 -q: Suppresses all output
 -v: Verbose
 COMMAND: The command to run (add, delete, change, get, monitor, flush)
 -net: <dest> is a network address
 -host: <dest> is host name or address (default)
 -netmask: the mask of the route
 <dest>: IP address or host name of the destination
 <gateway>: IP address or host name of the next-hop router

ReactOS

Syntax
Print the route table:
 route print
Add a route:
 route add <target> [mask <mask>] <gw> [metric <m>]
Delete a route:
 route delete <target> <gw>

See also

 Routing table
 Internet Protocol Suite
 iproute2
 BusyBox

Further reading

References

External links

 
 
 
 
 route - on technet.microsoft.com

Internet Protocol based network software
OS/2 commands
Routing
Unix network-related software
Windows communication and services
Windows administration